Solar power in New Zealand is increasing in capacity, despite no government subsidies or interventions being available. As at the end of December 2022, New Zealand has 255 MW of grid-connected photovoltaic (PV) solar power installed, of which 65 MW (25%) was installed that year. In the 12 months to September 2022, 249 gigawatt-hours of electricity was estimated to have been generated by grid-connected solar, 0.57% of all electricity generated in the country.

Although there are no subsidies, the declining costs of photovoltaics has caused a large increase in demand over the last few years. In 2009, the average turnkey price for a standard PV system of three kilowatts (kW) was about NZ$40,000; by 2019 this had dropped to approx. NZ$8,500.

Distributed systems
As of the end of December 2022, 45,761 solar power systems had been installed in New Zealand. For new installations added in December 2022, the average residential system size was 5.7 kW and the average commercial system was 38.4 kW.

The largest solar power system on a school in New Zealand was officially opened in a ceremony in February 2019 at Kaitaia College. Kelvin Davis, unveiled a plaque to acknowledge the installation of the 368 solar panel project which is spread across the rooftop of multiple buildings on the school campus.

By January 2014, solar photovoltaic systems had been installed in 50 schools through the Schoolgen program, a program developed by Genesis Energy to educate students about renewable energy, particularly solar energy. Each school has been given a 2 kW capacity PV system, with a total distributed installed capacity of 100 kilowatts-peak (kWp). Since February 2007, a total of 513 megawatt-hours (MWh) of electrical energy have been recorded.

In January 2020 Foodstuffs announced it would be installing a 1.1 MW PV array on its new Auckland distribution centre. In October 2020 Watercare Services installed a 1 MW floating array on its Auckland wastewater treatment plant.

In 2021, Kea Energy commissioned a solar power plant in the Wairau Valley in Marlborough with a potential capacity of 2.2 MW, with current plans to build capacity up to 1.85 MW as at March 2021. In June 2021, the Todd Corporation commissioned a 2.1MW solar plant at Kapuni in south Taranaki. The facility includes 5800 solar panels and was claimed to be the largest grid-connected solar plant at the time.

Grid-scale plants 
In July 2019 Refining NZ announced plans for a 26 MW solar farm at the Marsden Point Oil Refinery, but by May 2020 the project was on hold. In February 2020 Genesis Energy Limited announced plans for a 300 MW facility in the Waikato.' In September 2020 Hawke's Bay Airport announced plans for a 10 MW farm on unused airport land. In May 2020, the Ministry of Business, Innovation and Employment released a study that considered the economics of grid-scale solar and gave forecasts to 2060, showing that New Zealand has potential for gigawatts of grid-scale solar. 

In February 2021 Far North Solar Farm applied for resource consent for a 16 MW farm at Pukenui on the Aupouri Peninsula in Northland. In May 2021 Lodestone Energy announced plans for five solar farms in the upper North Island, capable of generating 400 GWh annually.

In December 2021 Christchurch Airport announced it would be hosting a 150 MW plant at Kōwhai Park, to be scaled up over 30 years. On 30 December 2021 Island Green Power announced plans for a 200MW solar farm in Waikato. In April 2022 Helios Energy announced plans for a series of farms with a combined output of 1 GW. In May 2022 Far North Solar Farm announced a partnership with Aquila Capital to build 1 GW of generation.

Proposed and under construction
Only solar plants over 5 MW generating capacity are listed.

Cost-effectiveness

Retail buy-back rates for solar power exported to the grid range from 7 to 17 cents, plus 15% GST if the system owner is GST-registered. Cost-effectiveness of a residential solar power occurs when system owners aim to use more of their solar power than what they export, by means of timed appliances, turning on appliances when the sun is out, energy management systems and battery storage. Commercial buildings that use power during the day can get a high return on their investment.

A 2015 study found that PV was more economical than grid supply if all the PV electricity was used on site and none was exported to the grid. For residential and commercial installations, improving energy efficiency is a lower cost option than PV.

Statistics

See also

 Solar power
 Photovoltaic power station
 Energy in New Zealand
 Electricity sector in New Zealand
 Renewable energy in New Zealand
 Wind power in New Zealand
 Ocean power in New Zealand
 Geothermal power in New Zealand
 Biofuel in New Zealand
 Hydroelectric power in New Zealand
 Solar hot water in New Zealand
 Renewable energy commercialisation
 Renewable energy by country

References

External links
 Energy Efficiency and Conservation Authority - Solar Energy
 Sustainable Electricity Association of New Zealand
 The price of a solar power system